Aldnoah.Zero is a mecha anime television series created by Gen Urobuchi and Olympus Knights, and animated by A-1 Pictures and Troyca. The series presents the story of the Vers Empire's 37 clans of Orbital Knights' attempted reconquest of Earth—enabled by the empowering titular Aldnoah energy/drive technology—following their return to Earth as a more technologically advanced people after a human diaspora to the planet Mars. Created by Gen Urobuchi with direction by Ei Aoki, the series features principle Japanese voice acting by Natsuki Hanae, Kensho Ono, and Sora Amamiya, with animated relational and battle scenes set on or in the fictional Earth of 2014, the orbital castles of Vers Empire's Orbital Knights, Vers bases on a shattered remnant of Earth's moon, and occasionally, the Vers palace of its failing emperor on Mars. The series began in July 2014, and as of March 2016, had presented two full 12-episode seasons, with Urobuchi, Katsuhiko Takayama, and Shinsuke Onishi, and then Hiroyuki Sawano and Kalafina, respectively, receiving principle script-writing and music credits.

Setting
Astronauts from the Apollo 17 mission find ancient technology (later named the "Hypergate") on the Moon that allows for near-instantaneous travel to and from Mars, allowing for the colonisation of Mars. More ancient technology found on Mars (dubbed "Aldnoah") is claimed by the immigrants who would go on to declare independence and found the Vers Empire. This leads to a tense state of affairs with Earth, eventually culminating in open war in 1999. During a battle between the United Earth Federation and the Vers Empire on the Moon, the Hypergate goes out of control and explodes, destroying the Moon in an event that would come to be known as "Heaven's Fall". The destruction of the Hypergate causes Imperial Vers Army forces to be stranded in Earth orbit, leading to a ceasefire between Earth and Mars.

Episode list

Season 1 (2014)

Season 2 (2015)

References

External links
 List of episodes at Tokyo MX 

Aldnoah.Zero